Naked Therapy (Spanish:Terapia al desnudo) is a 1975 Spanish comedy film directed by Pedro Lazaga and starring Carmen Sevilla, José María Íñigo and Ramiro Oliveros.

Cast
 Carmen Sevilla as Doctora Sol Esteve  
 José María Íñigo as Viajero  
 Ramiro Oliveros as Doctor Ríos  
 María Salerno as Marta  
 Manuel Zarzo as Inspector Sánchez  
 Fernando Hilbeck as Doctor Álex Céspedes  
 Rafael Hernández as Enrique  
 Inés Morales as Doctora Madrigal 
 Rosa Valenty as Recepcionista  
 Carmen Martínez Sierra as Carola  
 Beatriz Savón as Julia  
 Mónica Rey as Alicia  
 Rafael Conesa as Guillermo  
 Ángela Ayllón as Pura  
 Francisco Ortuño as Carcelero  
 Ramón Lillo as Doctor Gordillo  
 Juan Antonio Soler as Doctor Rosales  
 Alfonso Castizo as Policía 1º  
 José Luis Manrique as Policía 2º  
 María Esperanza Navarro as Doctora Redondo  
 Alfredo Mayo as Director del sanatorio  
 Juan Luis Galiardo as Ricardo 
 Manolo Codeso 
 Emilio Gutiérrez Caba

References

Bibliography
 Mira, Alberto. The A to Z of Spanish Cinema. Rowman & Littlefield, 2010.

External links 

1975 films
Spanish comedy films
1975 comedy films
1970s Spanish-language films
Films directed by Pedro Lazaga
1970s Spanish films